Jamahl Mosley (born October 6, 1978) is an American professional basketball coach and former player who is the head coach of the Orlando Magic of the National Basketball Association (NBA). He played college basketball for the Colorado Buffaloes and professionally for four seasons overseas.

Mosley began his coaching career in 2005 as a player development coach for the Denver Nuggets. He was promoted to assistant coach in 2007 and served in the same capacity for the Cleveland Cavaliers and Dallas Mavericks. After seven years with the Mavericks, Mosley was hired as head coach for the Orlando Magic in 2021.

Playing career
Mosley played college basketball for the Colorado Buffaloes and was a third-team All-Big 12 selection in 2000. He began his career in Mexico with Petroleros de Salamanca in 2001 before he joined the Victoria Titans of the Australian National Basketball League (NBL) and was named the league's Best Sixth Man in 2002. Mosley signed with Baloncesto León in 2003 and played there for one season. He split the 2004–05 season with Korihait in Finland and the Seoul Samsung Thunders in South Korea where he finished his playing career.

Coaching career
Mosley joined the Denver Nuggets of the NBA as a player development coach and scout in 2005. He was promoted to an assistant coach in 2007. Mosley worked as an assistant coach for the Cleveland Cavaliers from 2010 to 2014. He joined the Dallas Mavericks as an assistant coach in 2014. Mosley became the Mavericks' defensive coordinator in 2018 and was responsible for the team's defensive strategies.

On July 11, 2021, Mosley was named as head coach of the Orlando Magic.

Head coaching record

|-
| style="text-align:left;"|Orlando
| style="text-align:left;"|
| 82||22||60|||| align="center"|5th in Southeast||—||—||—||—
| style="text-align:center;"|Missed playoffs
|-class="sortbottom"
| style="text-align:center;" colspan="2"|Career||82||22||60|||| ||0||0||0||||

References

External links
College statistics
Colorado Buffaloes bio

1978 births
Living people
African-American basketball coaches
African-American basketball players
American expatriate basketball people in Australia
American expatriate basketball people in Finland
American expatriate basketball people in Mexico
American expatriate basketball people in South Korea
American expatriate basketball people in Spain
American men's basketball coaches
American men's basketball players
Baloncesto León players
Basketball players from Milwaukee
Cleveland Cavaliers assistant coaches
Colorado Buffaloes men's basketball players
Dallas Mavericks assistant coaches
Denver Nuggets assistant coaches
Forwards (basketball)
Orlando Magic head coaches
Seoul Samsung Thunders players
Sportspeople from Milwaukee
Victoria Giants players
21st-century African-American sportspeople
20th-century African-American sportspeople